Indian Tamils may refer to:

 Tamil people from or living in India
 Indian Tamils of Sri Lanka